Urgency is the fourth album by Bellingham, Washington indie rock band The Pale Pacific (formerly The Pale).

Track listing 
"In the Sun, Pt. 2" – 2:01
"Sucker Punch" – 5:17
"Tied to a Million Things" – 3:54
"Identity Theft" – 3:14
"Fortune Folds" – 4:38
"Your Parent's House" – 4:04
"Written Down" – 3:54
"The Strangest Second Chance" – 2:43
"If Only She'd Leave Town" – 4:11
"Back to You" – 3:12
"Fall to Place" – 8:16

The Pale Pacific albums
2005 albums